Davide Sanguinetti was the defending champion but lost in the quarterfinals to Martin Verkerk.

Verkerk won in the final 6–4, 5–7, 7–5 against Yevgeny Kafelnikov.

Seeds
A champion seed is indicated in bold text while text in italics indicates the round in which that seed was eliminated.

  Jiří Novák (first round)
  Sjeng Schalken (first round)
  Younes El Aynaoui (first round)
  Xavier Malisse (second round)
  Yevgeny Kafelnikov (final)
  Fabrice Santoro (withdrew because of general fatigue)
  Nicolas Escudé (first round)
  Jarkko Nieminen (semifinals)

Draw

External links
 2003 Main draw

Milan Indoor
2003 ATP Tour
Milan